Trevor Gordon (18 February 1915 – 22 October 2011) was an Australian cricketer. He played two first-class matches for Tasmania in 1948/49.

See also
 List of Tasmanian representative cricketers

References

External links
 

1915 births
2011 deaths
Australian cricketers
Tasmania cricketers
Cricketers from Hobart